The International Powerlifting Federation is an international governing body for the sport of powerlifting as recognized by the General Association of International Sports Federations (GAISF).

The IPF was founded in 1972, and comprises member federations from more than one hundred countries with new ones being added yearly. The current IPF president is Gaston Parage, from Luxembourg. The first president of the federation was Robert Christ. The IPF is the largest powerlifting federation in the world.

IPF is a drug-tested powerlifting federation that restricts supportive equipment in both equipped and raw competitions to an approved list which is updated from time to time. Typically in equipped competition the usage is limited to single-ply polyester shirts and suits with wrist and knee wraps while soft suits and neoprene knee sleeves are permitted in the classic powerlifting division (referred to as unequipped or raw competition).

History 
The first world weightlifting championship was held in 1971 with rarely anyone from outside the U.S appeared. In 1972, the second world weightlifting championship event was held by the Amateur Athletic Union leading to the creation of the IPF.

World championships 

IPF Classic Powerlifting World Championships
IPF World Open Powerlifting Championships
IPF World Bench Press Championship
IPF Classic Bench Press World Championship

List of national affiliates by region

Africa
Federation Algerienne Et De Powerlifting
Cameroon Powerlifting Federation
Ghana Powerlifting Federation
Libyan Powerlifting Federation
Libyan Weightlifting, Powerlifting and Bodybuilding Federation
Moroccan Powerlifting/Armwrestling Association
South African Powerlifting Federation
Sierra Leone Powerlifting Association

Asia
Asian Powerlifting Federation (link)
Afghanistan Powerlifting Federation
Hong Kong Weightlifting and Powerlifting Association
Powerlifting India
Indonesia Powerlifting Federation
I.R. Iran Powerlifting Union
Iraqi Powerlifting Federation
Japan Powerlifting Association (JPA)
Kazakhstan Powerlifting Federation
Korea Powerlifting Federation
Kyrgyzstan Powerlifting Federation
Lebanon Powerlifting Federation - Provisional Member
Malaysian Association for Powerlifting
Mongolian United Powerlifting Federation
Oman Committee for Weightlifting & Body-Building
Pakistan Powerlifting Federation - Provisional Member
Powerlifting Association of the Philippines (P.A.P.)
Powerlifting Singapore
Sri Lanka Powerlifting Federation - Provisional Member
Chinese Taipei Powerlifting Association
Sports Athletics Federation of Turkmenistan
Thai Powerlifting Federation (link)
UAE Powerlifting Association
Uzbekistan Powerlifting Federation

Europe
European Powerlifting Federation (link)
Armenian Powerlifting Federation
Österreichischer Verband für Kraftdreikampf (OEVK)
Belarus Powerlifting Federation
Royal Belgian Weightlifting Federation (FRBPH)
Bulgarian Powerlifting Federation
Croatia Powerlifting Federation
Czech Powerlifting Federation
Danish Powerlifting Federation
Estonian Powerlifting Federation
Finnish Powerlifting Federation
Fédération française de force
Georgian Federation of Athleticism
Bundesverband Deutscher Kraftdreikämpfer e.V. (BVDK)
British Powerlifting
Hellenic Powerlifting Federation
Hungarian Powerlifting Federation
Icelandic Powerlifting Federation
Irish Powerlifting Federation
Israel Powerlifting Federation
Federazione Italiana Powerlifting (F.I.P/L)
Latvian Powerlifting Federation
Lithuanian Powerlifting Federation
Fédération Luxemburgeoise d'Haltérophile, de Lutte et de Powerlifting (FLH)
Norwegian Powerlifting Federation
Polski Związek Kulturystyki I Trójboju Siłowego
Federatia Romana de Powerlifting
Russian Powerlifting Federation
Serbia Powerlifting Federation
Slovak Bodybuilding, Fitness and Powerlifting Association
Slovenian Powerlifting Federation
Asociación Española de Powerlifting (AEP)
Svenska Styrkelyftförbundet
Swiss Powerlifting Congress
NPB - Dutch Powerlifting Federation
Ukraine Powerlifting Federation

North America
Bahamas Powerlifting Federation
British Virgin Islands Powerlifting Federation
Canadian Powerlifting Union (link)
Cayman Islands Powerlifting Organization
Asociacion Deportiva de Levantamiento de Potencia (ADELEPO)
Dominican Republic Powerlifting Federation - Provisional Member
Federación Nacional de Levantamiento de Potencia de Guatemala
Federación Mexicana de Powerlifting (FEMEPO)
Powerlifting America
Puerto Rico Powerlifting Federation
Trinidad & Tobago Powerlifting Federation
Virgin Islands Powerlifting Federation

Oceania
Australian Powerlifting Union APU (link)
Fiji Powerlifting Federation
Kiribati Powerlifting Federation - Provisional Member
Marshall Islands Powerlifting Federation
Comite Regional Halterophilie Force Athletique, Musculation et Culturisme de Nou
New Zealand Powerlifting Federation
Niue Island Powerlifting Association
Papua New Guinea Amateur Weightlifting Association
Nauru Powerlifting Federation
Samoa Powerlifting Federation
Tonga Powerlifting Federation
Tuvalu Powerlifting Federation (TPF)

South America
Federacion Argentina de Levantamientos de Potencia
Confederacao Brasileira de Levantamentos Básicos (CBLB)
Federación Colombiana de Levantamiento de Potencia (FECOP)
Federación Ecuatoriana de Fisico Culturismo y Levantamiento de Potencia (FEFICU)
Guyana Amateur Powerlifting Federation
Federacion Deportiva Nacional de Levantamiento de Potencia (FDNLP)
Federacion Uruguaya de Potencia

See also
International Powerlifting Federation - 1975 World Congress and Championships
International World Games Association
SportAccord

References

External links
Official IPF web site

Powerlifting
International sports organizations